Basavaraj Ganpathrao Patil Sedam (born 10 February 1944) is an Indian politician who was the member of parliament in the Lok Sabha from Kalaburagi and member of parliament in the Rajya Sabha from Karnataka. He is a Patron Of Bharat Vikas Sangam and He is brought up in the severe atmosphere of Tarnahalli, in the midst of god fearing, nature-loving agriculturists. His early education was in the Village School, which Studying for his Science graduation, he was attracted to the cultural organization Rashtriya Swamyam Sevak Sangha.

The cardinal aim of the organization was the resurrection of Hindu Culture and ethos. This principle attracted Sri Patil and he became its full-time worker named a PRACHARAK. Some of the Notable milestones of his public service and philanthropic activities are enumerated here

In the year 1974 with the holy blessings of Poojya Sri Madivalayya Swamiji of Sri Kottala Basaveshwara Temple, Sedam a unique educational cultural and social organization was started under the banner of Sri Kottala Basaveshwara Bharatiya Shikshana Samiti Sedam. Under this, Samiti started Nursery school, High schools, Junior college, First-grade college, D Ed college, Law college, CBSE School and State Board English Medium School. Along with this, Samiti also started the school of music, gymnasium, medical center, Goshala & others institutions. More than 7000 students are studying in this educational institution with nearly 400 teaching and non-teaching staff.

It is the humble desire of Sri Basavaraj Patil Sedam that the development activity should blossom with the active participation of the general public. By this socio – cultural and educational activities we have to erase the nameplate "Backward Region". His concentrated efforts have started yielding results and more is expected from this region which was once the cradle of Vidya (education) Vidwat (Knowledge) and Vidyut (Brilliance).

As an Ordent RSS worker

Swaymasevak in RSS 1954
Pracharak – Santal paragana Dist in Bihar Tribal area 1967 – 73
Yeoman Service rendered in Famine relief work in Gulbarga Dist.
Managed 40 poor feeding centers in the famine hit areas.

Service in Social Sector

Patron-Bharat Vikas Sangam
Founder & President Sri Sharanappa Paramanna Kanagadda Trust Sedam
Member – Karnataka Asprishyata Nivarana Samiti
Member – Hyderabad Karnataka Development Board Gulbara
Secretary – Sri Kottala Basaveshwara Temple Trust
Chief coordinator – Hyderabad Karnataka Abhivridhi Vibhaga an initiative to erase the name plate of Backward Region comprising Bidar, Gulbarga, Raichur, Koppal Dist.
Active Member of many Organizations working in the field of culture, Social Service History & Literature.

Service in the field of Education :

President : Bharatiya Vidya Kendra Sirnoor – Gulbarga – Residential School
Member : Shikshana Vikas Parishad Bangalore – Karnataka
Member : Vidya Bharati Karnataka
Org. Secretary – Karnataka Rajya Madhyamik Shikshalok Sangha
Founder Member : Nrupatunga Adhyana Kendra, sedam
Co-op Member – Hyderabad Hindi Prachar Sabha
Donor Member – Karnataka Rajya Vignana Parishad, Bangalore
Vice – President – Vignaneshwara Souhardha Bhavan, Martur
National co-ordinator- Bharat Vikas Sangama since 2007
President – Vikas Academy Gulbarga
Adm-Director – Vinayak Trust (Mentally retarded Children School)
Member – Swadeshi Jagaran Mancha – New Delhi
Petron, Shri Kottal Basweswar Bhartiya Sikshan Samiti
Managing Trustee For Vikas Academy (KBVS Sedam) For The Total Development Hyderabad-Karnataka Region.

Award and Honor:

Suyatindra award from Sri Raghavendra Swamiji temple Mantralayam in the year 2007
Karnataka Rajyostava Prashasti in the year 2009
In the year 2011 Gulbarga University honored Doctorate award for Best social service in 4 dist.s of Hyderabad Karnataka area
Good educationist award from Sri Murugha math, Hubli 2012 January

In Political Area:

Member – Karnataka Legislative Counsel (Teachers Constituency) – 1990- 1996
Vice President – BJP Karnataka 1991-93
Secretary – BJP 1993-96
Member of Parliament Gulbarga 1998-99
National Secretary – BJP New Delhi
Member – Human Resource Development Committee Ministry of HRD Govt of India – Women empowerment committee Govt of India
President: Karnataka State BJP 2000-2003
Member Rajya Sabha From April 2012 to March 2018
Participated in 137th Inter-Parliamentary Union at St.Petersburg (Russian Federation) on 14-18 Oct 2017.

Family and personal life
Basvaraj Patil Sedam was born to Shrimati Shankramma and Shri Ganpath Rao on 10 February 1944 in Tarnalli, Kalaburagi district Karnataka. He completed his Bachelor of Science from the Government Degree College, Gulbarga. He is married to Baswalingamma.

Positions held
1990-96 Member, Karnataka Legislative Council.
1992	Member, Public Accounts Committee, Karnataka Legislative Council.
1998-1999	Member, Twelfth Lok Sabha Member, Committee on Human Resource Development and its Sub-Committee on Value Based Education Member, Consultative Committee for the Ministry of Urban Affairs and Employment Member, Joint Committee on the Empowerment of Women.
April 2012 Elected to Rajya Sabha May 2012 onwards	Member, Committee on Industry Member, Central Silk Board.

References

|-

Bharatiya Janata Party politicians from Karnataka
India MPs 1998–1999
1944 births
Living people
People from Kalaburagi district
Rajya Sabha members from Karnataka